Robertstown may refer to:
 Robertstown, County Kildare, village in Ireland
Robertstown GFC, Gaelic Football and Athletics Club
 Robertstown, County Limerick, civil parish in County Limerick, Ireland
 Robertstown, Moray, location in Moray, Scotland
 Robertstown, a village in Aberdare East, Rhondda Cynon Taf, Wales
 Robertstown, South Australia
Robertstown railway line
 Robertstown, Georgia, a community in the United States
 Robertstown Fort, County Meath, Ireland
 Robertstown Castle, County Meath, Ireland
 Robertstown University, a fake university formerly operated by an American fraud ring

See also
Roberts Township (disambiguation)
Roberttown, village in West Yorkshire